Dendrocalamus sikkimensis is a bamboo species belonging to the Dendrocalamus genus. It has many branches that are normally orange in colour.

References 

sikkimensis
Plants described in 1888
Taxa named by Daniel Oliver
Taxa named by James Sykes Gamble